Western may refer to:

Places
Western, Nebraska, a village in the US
Western, New York, a town in the US
Western Creek, Tasmania, a locality in Australia
Western Junction, Tasmania, a locality in Australia
Western world, countries that identify with shared "Western" culture

Arts and entertainment

Films
Western (1997 film), a French road movie directed by Manuel Poirier
Western (2017 film), a German-Austrian film

Genres
Western (genre), a category of fiction and visual art centered on the American Old West
Western fiction, the Western genre as featured in literature
Western music (North America), a type of American folk music

Music
Westerns (EP), an EP by Pete Yorn
WSTRN, a British hip hop group from west London

Business 
The Western, a closed hotel/casino in Las Vegas, United States
Western Cartridge Company, a manufacturer of ammunition
Western Publishing, a defunct publishing company

Educational institutions
Western Washington University in Bellingham, Washington, United States
Western Theological Seminary in Holland, Michigan, United States
Western University of Health Sciences in Pomona, California, United States
University of Western Ontario, London, Ontario, Canada (branded as Western University since 2012)
Western University (Azerbaijan), Baku
Western High School (disambiguation)

Foods
Denver sandwich or Western sandwich
Western omelet

Sport
Western A.F.C., a football club from Christchurch, New Zealand
 Western Mustangs, the athletic program of the University of Western Ontario (aka Western University)
Western Open, a professional golf tournament
Westerns cricket team, a cricket team in Zimbabwe

Transportation
Western (airline), an airline founded in 2006
Western station (CTA Blue Line Forest Park branch)
Western station (CTA Blue Line O'Hare branch)
Western station (CTA Brown Line)
Western station (CTA Orange Line)
Western station (CTA Pink Line)
British Rail Class 52 or Westerns, a class of locomotives
Western Airlines, a defunct airline
Western Express Air, a regional airline in Bullhead City, Arizona, United States

People
Western (surname), a list of people with the surname

Other uses
Toronto Western Hospital, Toronto, Canada
Western blot, an analytical technique to detect proteins
Of or pertaining to Western culture

See also
Western Area, Sierra Leone
West (disambiguation)
Western Avenue (disambiguation)
Western Division (disambiguation)
Western Range (disambiguation), various mountain and missile ranges
Western Region (disambiguation)
Western Suburbs (disambiguation)
Weston (disambiguation)
Wests (disambiguation)